Peter Seisenbacher (born 25 March 1960) is a judo coach and retired judoka from Austria. He competed in the middleweight category (−86 kg) at the 1980, 1984 and 1988 Olympics and won two gold medals, in 1984 and 1988. He also won a world title in 1985 and European title in 1986.

After retiring from competitions, Seisenbacher worked as a judo coach, in Austria, Georgia (2010–2012), and Azerbaijan (2012–2013). Under his guidance, the Georgian team won 2 gold, 3 silver, and 4 bronze medals at European championships, one bronze medal at world championships, and an Olympic gold medal in 2012.

After years of circulating rumors, in June 2014 a number of women filed criminal complaints against Seisenbacher for alleged sexual misconduct against them when they were still minors. On 5 October 2016 Seisenbacher was formally indicted by the Vienna Prosecutor's Office for statutory rape of two girls who at the time were less than 14 years of age, and for attempted sexual assault of one girl who at the time was 16 years old. The first indictment involved a girl who was 11 when in 1999 she allegedly was sexually assaulted on multiple occasions by Seisenbacher lasting until 2001; the second indictment involved the sexual assault of a 13-year-old girl in 2004. The attempted sexual assault of the 16-year-old allegedly occurred during a training camp in Croatia in 2001.

The formal indictment came after a lengthy judicial investigation following earlier police complaints filed in 2013 by several former pupils, as reported by numerous newspapers in June 2014.

However, in December 2016 Seisenbacher failed to show up for his trial in court for two days in a row and instead fled the country, after which he officially became a fugitive from justice on worldwide warrant.
 While Interpol searched for him in Europe, Kazachstan, the United States and Dubai, Seisenbacher was able to remain on the run for 200 days. Considered dangerous, he was finally arrested by a SWAT team on 2 August 2017 in Kyiv, Ukraine and was handed over to Austria on 12 September 2019. The trial started on 25 November in Vienna; on 2 December Seisenbacher was found guilty and sentenced to 5 years in prison. On November 4, 2022 he was released from prison.

References

External links
 

1960 births
Living people
Austrian male judoka
Olympic judoka of Austria
Judoka at the 1980 Summer Olympics
Judoka at the 1984 Summer Olympics
Judoka at the 1988 Summer Olympics
Olympic gold medalists for Austria
Sportspeople from Vienna
Olympic medalists in judo
World judo champions
Medalists at the 1988 Summer Olympics
Medalists at the 1984 Summer Olympics
20th-century Austrian people